McGuire is a ghost town in Lafayette Township of Coshocton County, in the U.S. state of Ohio.

History
McGuire was first settled in 1807 by Frank McGuire and his family, and named for them.

References

Geography of Coshocton County, Ohio
Ghost towns in Ohio